Hereditary intestinal polyposis may refer to:
Peutz–Jeghers syndrome
Familial adenomatous polyposis